is a railway station in the city of Higashimatsushima, Miyagi Prefecture, Japan, operated by East Japan Railway Company (JR East).

Lines
The station is served by the Senseki Line. It is located 32.2 kilometers from the terminus of the Senseki Line at Aoba-dōri Station.

Station layout
Tōna Station has one side platform serving a single bi-directional track. The station is unattended.

History

Tōna Station opened on December 1, 1931 as a station on the Miyagi Electric Railway. The line was nationalized on May 1, 1944. The station was absorbed into the JR East network upon the privatization of JNR on April 1, 1987.

The station was destroyed on March 11, 2011 due to damage associated with the 2011 Tōhoku earthquake and tsunami, and services were replaced by provisional bus services. The station reopened on May 30, 2015 on a higher ground where the former community around the station would be reconstructed. Due to the relocation, the distance from Aoba-Dōri was changed from 32.4 kilometers to 32.2 kilometers.

Surrounding area
 Tōna Post Office
 Tōna beach

See also
 List of railway stations in Japan

References

External links

 

Railway stations in Miyagi Prefecture
Senseki Line
Railway stations in Japan opened in 1931
Higashimatsushima, Miyagi
Stations of East Japan Railway Company
Buildings damaged by the 2011 Tōhoku earthquake and tsunami